Michigan's 29th Senate district is one of 38 districts in the Michigan Senate. The 29th district was created by the 1850 Michigan Constitution, as the 1835 constitution only permitted a maximum of eight senate districts. It has been represented by Democrat Winnie Brinks since 2019, succeeding Republican Dave Hildenbrand.

Geography
District 29 encompasses part of Kent County.

2011 Apportionment Plan
District 29, as dictated by the 2011 Apportionment Plan, was based in Grand Rapids, which also covered the surrounding Kent County communities of East Grand Rapids, Lowell, Forest Hills, Cascade Township, Grand Rapids Township, Ada Township, and Caledonia Township.

The district was located entirely within Michigan's 3rd congressional district, and overlapped with the 73rd, 75th, 76th, and 86th districts of the Michigan House of Representatives.

List of senators

Recent election results

2018

2014

Federal and statewide results in District 29

Historical district boundaries

References 

29
Kent County, Michigan